Arisan Maru was a  Type 2A freighter constructed in 1944 during World War II and was one of Imperial Japan's hell ships. The vessel, named for a mountain on Formosa, was initially used as a troop transport. The vessel was then turned over for use for the transportation of prisoners of war (POWs) from the Philippines to Manchuria, China or Japan. On October 24, 1944, the ship was torpedoed by an American submarine and sank. Of the 1,781 POWs aboard, all of them escaped the sinking ship but were not rescued by the Japanese. In the end, only nine of the prisoners survived the sinking.

Description
The vessel was powered by steam turbines turning one propeller. The vessel had three holds, with No.2 hold being . The vessel was designed for the transportation of raw materials such as coal and nickel.

Service history
Arisan Maru was constructed by Mitsui at their yard in Tamano, Japan with the yard number 376. The freighter was completed on 22 June 1944 and owned by Mitsui Senpaku. The vessel was named for a mountain in Formosa and was first assigned to transport 6,000 troops of the Kwantung Army from Pusan, Korea to Okinawa. The vessel was then ordered to transport POWs from the Philippines to Manchuria, China, or Japan. On October 11, 1944, Arisan Maru embarked 1,782 Allied POWs at Manila, a mix of military personnel and civilian detainees. Detained Allied personnel were being evacuated from the Philippines and due to Allied air raids, they were quickly loaded onto the ship, with more people placed in the one hold than could be reasonably accommodated. Each POW was given eight five-gallon oil cans for their waste, which quickly overflowed due to a number of men afflicted by dysentery. The POWs suffered through unsanitary conditions, extreme heat within the hold and a lack of water.

Arisan Maru then departed Manila and sailed south to the west coast of Palawan. During this time an escape attempt led to a POW death, and four other POWs died of sickness. There, along the Palawan coast, Arisan Maru waited for several days while Allied air raids hit Manila. Then, on October 20, the freighter returned to Manila.

Final voyage
On October 21, Arisan Maru departed Manila for the final time, joining convoy MATA-30  heading for Takao. The convoy was composed of 13 merchant vessels, three destroyers as escorts and one fleet supply ship. On October 23, the destroyers began picking up signals from American submarines.

The ship buckled amidships, the engines stopped and the aft mast fell, but the freighter stayed afloat. In response to the torpedo, the destroyers  and  attacked and sank Shark. After dealing with the American submarine, the two destroyers returned to Arisan Maru to look for survivors. No POWs were killed by the torpedo strikes and nearly all were able to leave the ship's holds but the Japanese did not rescue any of the POWs that day, only Japanese. Only nine of the prisoners aboard survived the event. Five escaped and made their way to China in one of the ship's two lifeboats. They were reunited with U.S. Forces and returned to the United States. The four others were later recaptured by Imperial Japanese naval vessels, where one died shortly after reaching land.

See also
 List of battles and other violent events by death toll
 List by death toll of ships sunk by submarines

Citations

References

Further reading
 Wilber, Dale. The Last Voyage of the Arisan Maru. 2008.

External links
 Maritime Disasters of World War II.
 US POW lost on Arisan Maru
 The Arisan Maru Tragedy

World War II merchant ships of Japan
Ships sunk by American submarines
Maritime incidents in October 1944
1944 ships
Japanese hell ships